The 1920 United States presidential election in Colorado was held on November 2, 1920 as part of the 1920 United States presidential election. State voters chose six electors to the Electoral College, who voted for president and vice president.

In 1916, Colorado was the most Democratic state outside of the “Solid South” as a result of historic Bryanite Populist support in silver-mining regions, and a powerful "peace vote" for incumbent President Woodrow Wilson; however, by the beginning of 1920 skyrocketing inflation and Wilson's focus upon his proposed League of Nations at the expense of domestic policy had helped make the incumbent President very unpopular – besides which Wilson also had major health problems that had left First Lady Edith effectively running the nation. Political unrest seen in the Palmer Raids and the "Red Scare" further added to the unpopularity of the Democratic Party, since this global political turmoil produced considerable fear of alien revolutionaries invading the country. Demand in the West for exclusion of Asian immigrants became even stronger than it had been before.

All these factors combined to produce a national landslide, with a swing of almost twenty-nine percentage points to the Republicans vis-à-vis of four years earlier. Colorado mirrored this trend, with a total swing of 49.38 points from Wilson’s 26-point 1916 victory where he carried every county except Sedgwick. This time, Harding would not merely become only the second Republican victor in the state since James B. Weaver’s Populist victory transitioned the state into a Democratic-leaning one, but become the only presidential candidate in history to carry all Colorado’s counties. The state was still 2.84 points more Democratic than the nation at-large despite Harding’s historic county sweep.

Full results

Results by county

References

1920
Colorado
1920 Colorado elections